Saint Luke painting the Virgin is a c.1510 International Gothic limewood relief sculpture, probably carved by Jakub Beinhart and now in the National Museum, Warsaw. It is the only surviving fragment of an altarpiece for the painters' guild chapel in St Mary Magdalene Church, Wrocław, formerly forming its central panel.

Bibliography 
  Tadeusz Broniewski, Mieczysław Zlat (red.) Sztuka Wrocławia, Wrocław 1967.
  Tadeusz Chrzanowski, Sztuka Polski czasów Piastów i Jagiellonów. Zarys dziejów, Warszawa, 1993.
  Tadeusz Dobrowolski, Sztuka polska od czasów najdawniejszych do ostatnich, Kraków, 1974.
  Dobrosława Horzela, Adam Organisty (red.), Wokół Wita Stwosza, exhibition catalogue, Muzeum Narodowym w Krakowie, Kraków 2005 (opr. Jakub Kostowski).
  Wojciech Marcinkowski, Gotycka nastawa ołtarzowa u kresu rozwoju - Retabulum ze Ścinawy (1514) w kościele klasztornym w Mogile, Kraków 2006.
  Wojciech Walanus, Późnogotycka rzeźba drewniana w Małopolsce 1490-1540, Kraków 2006.
  Anna Ziomecka, Rzeźba i malarstwo od 2 poł. XIII do początku XVI wieku [w.] Zygmunt Świechowski (red.), Wrocław jego dzieje i kultura, Warszawa, 1978.
  Mieczysław Zlat, Sztuki śląskiej drogi od gotyku [w:] Późny gotyk. Studia nad sztuką przełomu średniowiecza i czasów nowych. Materiały sesji Stowarzyszenia Historyków Sztuki. Wrocław 1962, Warszawa 1965, s. 141-225

References

16th-century sculptures
Gothic sculptures
Sculptures of the National Museum, Warsaw
Statues of the Virgin Mary
Beinhart